Cuppa is a behavior-driven development (BDD) unit testing framework for the Java programming language version 8. The framework uses features introduced in version 8 of the language, such as lambdas. It is inspired by Mocha.

Cuppa is linked as a JAR at compile-time; the framework resides under the package org.forgerock.cuppa.

Example of a Cuppa test class 
A Cuppa test class is a Java object annotated with the @Test annotation.

import org.forgerock.cuppa.Cuppa.*;

@Test
public class ListTest {
    {
        describe("List", -> {
            describe("#indexOf", -> {
                it("returns -1 when the value is not present", -> {
                    List<Integer> list = Arrays.asList(1, 2, 3);
                    assertThat(list.indexOf(5)).isEqualTo(-1);
                });
            });
        });
    }
}

See also 
 JUnit, another test framework for Java
 RSpec, a similar test framework for Ruby

References

External links 
 

Cross-platform software
Free software programmed in Java (programming language)
Java development tools
Java platform
Unit testing frameworks
Software using the Apache license
Articles with example Java code